The 2022 J.League Asia Challenge was the 4th edition of the referred friendly association football tournament, played from 12 to 15 November on Thailand in 2 different venues.  Organized by the J.League, it is part of the J.LEAGUE Asian Strategy.

Format
Two teams from J.League and two teams from Thai League 1 participated on the tournament, organized in a round-robin tournament format. Unordinarily, each Thai League 1 team will face only one J.League opponent in the tournament, while both of the two J.League teams will face only one Thai League opponent, alongside a match-up between both Japanese clubs. With the amount of matches played when comparing the four teams being unproportional, no club was awarded a trophy, or deemed champions of the tournament.

Main attractions
The main individual attractions to the Thai football supporters were two national team players, as they were able to watch both players live on their own clubs, having only saw them play for the National Team. They are two of the few Thai League 1 products that went to play on the J1 League. One of two players, the current Thai national team captain, Chanathip Songkrasin, played for 5 years on Thailand for Police Tero and Muangthong United before moving abroad to play on Japan. Firstly for Consadole Sapporo, then for Kawasaki Frontale. The other player is the attacking midfielder Supachok Sarachat, product of Buriram United, who also played on loan on Surin City before joining Chanathip's former club Consadole Sapporo on 2022.

Squads

Teams

Fixtures and results
All times are Thailand Standard Time (UTC+7).

Matches

Top scorers

Broadcasting
In Thailand, matches were broadcast by Siamsport's YouTube Channel, and by PPTV, a digital terrestrial television. On Japan, matches were broadcast by J.League Official YouTube Channel (in Japanese). Viewers from overseas watched the matches on the J.League International YouTube channel.

References

External links
J.League Asia Challenge at J.LEAGUE Official Website (in English)

Thai football friendly trophies
2022 in Thai football
2022 in Japanese football
J.League Asia Challenge